Conseslus Kipruto (born 8 December 1994) is a Kenyan middle-distance runner who specializes in the 3000 metres steeplechase. He was the 2016 Rio Olympic champion in the event. At the World Athletics Championships, Kipruto won gold medals in 2017 and 2019, silver medals in 2013 and 2015, and a bronze in 2022. In 2018, he captured gold medals at the African Championships and Commonwealth Games. He is a four-time Diamond League winner.

Kipruto was the 2011 World Youth champion in the 2000 m steeplechase, and won 2012 World Junior title over the longer distance. He ranks second on the all-time junior lists with a time of 8:01.16 minutes. He set his personal best of 8:00.12 at the Birmingham Diamond League event in 2016.

Career
Kipruto quickly rose through the younger categories of the sport, beginning from 2010. He won the Kenyan youth trials in the 2000 m steeplechase with a world-leading mark of 5:29.3 minutes. At the 2011 World Youth Championships in Athletics he and teammate Gilbert Kiplangat Kirui ran away from the pack from the very start. Kipruto edged out his compatriot with a time of 5:28.65 minutes to take the gold medal and move up to seventh on the all-time youth rankings. He debuted in the 3000 m steeplechase in Europe later that year, running 8:27.30 minutes to win at the Stadionfest Königs Wusterhausen.

At the start of 2012 he entered two high-profile cross country races, winning the Lotto Cross Cup de Hannut and placing second at the Cross de San Sebastián. He moved up to the 3000 m distance in the steeplechase and placed second at the Kawasaki Super Meet in Japan before running 8:08.92 minutes for fifth in his IAAF Diamond League debut in Doha. He beat Kirui to the Kenyan junior title and his teammate helped pace him at the 2012 World Junior Championships in Athletics, where Kipruto won Kenya's 13th straight title in the event and ranked fourth on the all-time junior lists with a run of 8:06.10 minutes (also a championship record). He had his first big senior win soon after, beating Paul Kipsiele Koech at the Herculis 2012 Diamond League meet in a personal best of 8:03.49 minutes. He ranked sixth in the world that year. He also was runner-up at the Memorial van Damme and had a 3000 metres flat best of 7:44.09 minutes at the Rieti Meeting.

Kipruto made his first Kenyan cross country team in 2013. After a win at the Cross Internacional Juan Muguerza and third position at the Cross Internacional de Itálica in Spain, he only just made the junior team at the Kenyan trials, placing sixth. He performed one place better at the 2013 IAAF World Cross Country Championships, helping Kenya to the junior team silver medal. Heading into the track season, he opened with a meet record of 8:01.16 minutes at the Shanghai Golden Grand Prix, winning the first leg of the 2013 IAAF Diamond League steeplechase. This ranked him second on the all-time junior lists behind Stephen Cherono.

Achievements

International competitions

Circuit wins and titles
 Diamond League overall winner 3000 m steeplechase:  2013,  2016
 Diamond League champion 3000 m steeplechase:  2017,  2018
 3000 metres steeplechase wins, other events specified in parenthesis
 2012 (1): Monaco Herculis
 2013 (3): Shanghai Golden Grand Prix (  PB), Eugene Prefontaine Classic (MR), Oslo Bislett Games 
 2015 (1): London Anniversary Games
 2016 (6): Doha Qatar Athletic Super Grand Prix (WL), Rabat Meeting International (WL MR), Rome Golden Gala (WL), Birmingham British Athletics Grand Prix (WL MR PB), Monaco, Brussels Memorial Van Damme
 2017 (2): Rome, Brussels
 2018 (3): Rome (WL), Birmingham, Zürich Weltklasse

Personal bests
 3000 metres – 7:44.09 (Rieti 2012)
 3000 metres indoor – 7:55.76 (Glasgow 2016)
 5000 metres – 13:47.5h (Eldoret 2016)
 10,000 metres – 29:24.7h (Eldoret 2016)
 2000 metres steeplechase – 5:28.65 (Lille 2011)
 3000 metres steeplechase – 8:00.12 (Birmingham 2016)

References

External links

Living people
1994 births
Kenyan male steeplechase runners
Kenyan male middle-distance runners
Kenyan male long-distance runners
Kenyan male cross country runners
Olympic athletes of Kenya
Olympic gold medalists for Kenya
Olympic male steeplechase runners
Olympic gold medalists in athletics (track and field)
Athletes (track and field) at the 2016 Summer Olympics
Athletes (track and field) at the 2018 Commonwealth Games
Medalists at the 2016 Summer Olympics
World Athletics Championships athletes for Kenya
World Athletics Championships medalists
Commonwealth Games medallists in athletics
Commonwealth Games gold medallists for Kenya
World Athletics Championships winners
African Championships in Athletics winners
Diamond League winners
IAAF Continental Cup winners
Commonwealth Games gold medallists in athletics
People from Uasin Gishu County
Medallists at the 2018 Commonwealth Games